The European driving licence is a driving licence issued by the member states of the European Economic Area (EEA); all 27 EU member states and three EFTA member states; Iceland, Liechtenstein and Norway, which give shared features the various driving licence styles formerly in use. It is credit card-style with a photograph and a microchip. They were introduced to replace the 110 different plastic and paper driving licences of the 300 million drivers in the EEA. The main objective of the licence is to reduce the risk of fraud.

A driving licence issued by a member state of the EEA is recognised throughout the EEA and can be used as long as it is valid, the driver is old enough to drive a vehicle of the equivalent category, and the licence is not suspended or restricted and has not been revoked in the issuing country. If the holder of an EEA driving licence moves to another EEA country, the licence can be exchanged for a driving licence from the new EEA country. However, as all EEA driving licences are recognised throughout the EEA, it is usually not necessary to exchange it.

The exception is for those holding EEA driving licences issued in exchange for a non‑EEA licence. When holding a converted licence, one should not assume the licence is recognized when moving to another EEA country, which might require that the driving licence be converted again to a licence issued by that country.

History

1980–1996 
The first step to a European driving licence was taken on 4 December 1980, when the Council of Ministers adopted Council Directive 80/1263/EEC on the introduction of a Community driving licence, which established a Community model national licence that guaranteed the mutual recognition by the Member States of national licences. It also established the practice of exchange of licences by holders moving from one Member State to another.

1996–2013 

On 29 July 1991, the Council of Ministers adopted the Council of the European Union Directive 91/439/EEC on driving licences. The directive required EU Member States to adopt laws implementing the directive before 1 July 1994, which took effect on 1 July 1996. Directive 80/1263/EEC was repealed on the same date. 

Directive 91/439/EEC was incorporated into the EEA Agreement through Decision of the EEA Joint Committee No 7/94 of 21 March 1994, and specified driving licence in the European Union and the European Economic Area until its repeal on 19 January 2013.

Provisions 
The Council of the European Union Directive 91/439/EEC harmonised the categories of driving licences among the Member States and established two Community driving licence models, one paper version and one plastic card version. It furthermore established an obligatory test of knowledge (theory) and a test of skills and behaviour (practical) which had to be successfully passed before an individual is offered a driving licence. It also required an applicant to meet the minimum standards of physical and mental fitness to drive. The directive specified the minimum ages for driving different types of vehicles, and established progressive access in categories A, C, and D, from light vehicles to larger or more powerful vehicles. The directive stipulated that it is mandatory to have the normal residence in the Member State issuing the licence.

Amendments 
The Directive was substantially amended by nine directives and two acts of accession. The plastic card version of the Community licence model, for example, was added to the Directive by Council Directive 96/47/EC of 23 July 1996.

Since 2013 

In March 2006, the Council of Ministers adopted a Directive proposed by the European Commission to create a single European driving licence to replace the 110 different models in existence throughout the EU/EEA at the time. The European Parliament adopted the Directive in December 2006. Directive 2006/126/EEC was published in the Official Journal of the European Union on 30 December 2006.
Its provisions took effect on 19 January 2013; Directive 91/439/EEC was then concurrently repealed.

Provisions 
The licence is a credit-card-style, single plastic-coated document, very difficult to counterfeit. The document is renewable every 10 or 15 years depending on the member state. Several member states have the option to include a microchip containing information about the card holder on the card.

Some categories like C and D are issued for five years only. After expiration, a medical check-up is necessary in order to renew the licence for another five years.

EEA relevance 

The provisions of Directive 2006/126/EC mention that it has European Economic Area (EEA) relevance, meaning that its provisions apply to all 27 EU member states, as well as Iceland, Liechtenstein, and Norway, through incorporation into the agreement on the EEA. 

The Directive was incorporated into the EEA agreement through Decision of the EEA Joint committee No 29/2008 of 14 March 2008 amending Annex XIII (Transport) to the EEA Agreement. The Decision made some adaptions to the directive, notably: the distinguishing sign issuing the licence is encircled by an ellipse instead of being printed on the European flag, the words "driving licence" in Icelandic and Norwegian languages were added, and the words “European Communities model” were replaced by “EEA model”. 

Although Switzerland is a member state of EFTA, it is not a contracting party of EEA Agreement. Switzerland is instead linked to the EU by a series of bilateral agreements and has generally adopted much of the harmonised EU legislation with regard to driving licences. Switzerland has used categories similar to the EU system of vehicle categories since the 2000s, and Swiss driving licences resemble EEA-style credit-card licences, comparable to other non-EU/EEA European countries.

Implementation
The directive stipulated that all 31 EEA members states must have adopted laws implementing the directive no later than 19 January 2011. Those laws took effect in all EEA members states on 19 January 2013. All licences issued before that date will become invalid by 2033.

Brexit
Directive 2006/126/EC applied to the United Kingdom until the transition period after the UK withdrew from the EU terminated on 31 December 2020, as EU law continued to apply to the UK during this period. 

From 1 January 2021, European licences are recognized by the UK if the driving test was passed in an EU/EEA country, and can be used both if the holder is visiting or if residing in the UK. They can also be exchanged for a UK driving licence. 

UK driving licences can be used when visiting EU/EEA countries with some exceptions. International Driving Permits might be needed in some cases. Depending on which convention the country in question has ratified, a 1949 IDP (Geneva Convention on Road Traffic) might be required in some EEA countries, and a 1968 IDP (Vienna Convention on Road Traffic) in others. However, none of the EEA countries currently require IDPs for visitors staying shorter than 12 months.

Standard data field labelling 
To help users of different languages to understand what each of the data fields on the licence contains, each is labelled with a number. A legend on the back of the card identifies each field in the issuing authority's language.

 surname
 other names
 date of birth, place of birth
 a) date of issue, b) date of expiry, c) issuing authority, d) different number from the one under heading 5, for administrative purposes
 licence number
 photograph of holder
 signature of holder
 address
 licence categories
  first issuing date of the category
 expiry date of the category
 restrictions (number coded)
 space reserved for the possible entry by the host Member State of information essential for administering the licence 
 space reserved for the possible entry by the Member State which issues the licence of information essential for administering the licence or related to road safety (optional).

Notes

ISO/IEC 18013-1:2018 extends the numbering of Directive 2006/126/EC to include other data fields (sex, height, weight, eye color, hair color) and is used by other countries such as Canada.

Categories valid in all EEA member states

National categories in EEA member states 
There are other national categories for tractors, large motorcycles, motorised wheel boats, motor tricycles (modern voiturettes, Category B1 or S), and military categories such as for driving tanks. National categories mean they are not harmonised and only valid within the issuing country. The table below gives general descriptions that do not include full details of regulations.

Overview of driving licences

See also 
 Driving licence
 European Commissioner for Transport
 European Health Insurance Card
 European identity card
 International Driving Permit
 Vehicle registration plates of Europe
 Prawo Jazdy (alleged criminal) - supposed Polish national with numerous traffic violations in Ireland, construed from misreading the Polish driver's license

Notes

References

External links

European Union
Driving licences
Identity documents
Traffic law
European Union law